Kanta is a masculine Japanese given name. Notable people with the name include:

Kanta Higashionna (born 1992), Japanese rugby union player 
Kanta Ina, Japanese actor
Kanta Kondo (born 1993), Japanese football player
, Japanese actor
Kanta Tsuneyama (born 1996), Japanese badminton player

Japanese masculine given names